Carl Ludwig "Luz" Long (27 April 1913 – 14 July 1943) was a German Olympic long jumper, notable for winning the silver medal in the event at the 1936 Summer Olympics in Berlin and for his association with Jesse Owens, who went on to win the gold medal for the long jump. Luz Long won the German long jump championship six times in 1933, 1934, 1936, 1937, 1938, and 1939.

Long was killed while serving in the German Army during World War II.

Early life
Long studied law at the University of Leipzig, where in 1936 he joined the Leipziger Sport Club. After graduating, he practiced as a lawyer in Hamburg while continuing his interest in sport.

1936 Olympic Games

The 21-year-old, 1.84-metre-tall (6'½") Long had finished third in the 1934 European Championships in Athletics with 7.25 metres (23'9½"). By the summer of 1936, Long held the European record in the long jump and was eager to compete for the first time against Jesse Owens, the American world-record holder. The long jump on 4 August was Long's first event against Owens, and Long met his expectations by setting an Olympic record during the preliminary round. In contrast, Owens fouled on his first two jumps. Knowing that he needed to reach at least 7.15 metres (about 23 feet 5½ inches) on his third jump in order to advance to the finals in the afternoon, Owens sat on the field, dejected.

Speaking to Long's son in 1964, Owens said that Long went to him during the Olympics and told him to try to jump from a spot several inches behind the take-off board. Since Owens routinely made distances far greater than the minimum of 7.15 metres (23'5½") required to advance, Long surmised that Owens would be able to advance safely to the next round without risking a foul trying to push for a greater distance. Owens later admitted that this was not true, as he and Long never met until after the competition was over. On his third qualifying jump, Owens was calm and jumped with at least four inches (10 centimeters) to spare, easily qualifying for the finals. In the finals competition later that day, the jumpers exceeded the old Olympic record five times.

Owens went on to win the gold medal in the long jump with 8.06 metres (26'5¼") while besting Long's own record of 7.87 metres (25'9¾"). Long won the silver medal for second place and was the first to congratulate Owens: they posed together for photos and walked arm-in-arm to the dressing room. Owens said, "It took a lot of courage for him to befriend me in front of Hitler... I would melt down all the medals and cups I have and they wouldn't be a plating on the twenty-four karat friendship that I felt for Luz Long at that moment".
Long's competition with Owens is recorded in Leni Riefenstahl's documentary Olympia – Fest der Völker.

Two days later, Long finished 10th in the triple jump. He went on to finish third in the 1938 European Championships in Athletics long jump with 7.56 metres (24'9½").

World War II
Luz Long served in the Wehrmacht during World War II, having the rank of Obergefreiter. During the Allied invasion of Sicily in Italy, Long was injured on July 10, 1943, in the battle for the Biscari-Santo Pietro airfield, and died 4 days later in a British military hospital.   He was buried in the war cemetery of Motta Sant'Anastasia in Sicily.

Long and Owens corresponded after 1936. In his last letter, Long wrote to Owens and asked him to contact his son Karl after the war and tell him about his father and "what times were like when we not separated by war. I am saying—tell him how things can be between men on this earth". After the war, Owens travelled to Germany to meet Karl Long. Long is seen with Owens in the documentary Jesse Owens Returns To Berlin where he is in conversation with Owens in the Berlin Olympic Stadium.

Memorials
Roads near sports facilities in Long's home town of Leipzig, and in the Munich Olympia Park of 1972 are named after him. His medal, photos, and documents were donated to the Sportmuseum Leipzig.

In popular culture
In the film The Jesse Owens Story (1984), he is portrayed by Kai Wulff.

In the film Race, he is played by David Kross.

References

Further reading
 Karl-Heinrich Long: Luz Long – eine Sportlerkarriere im Dritten Reich. Sein Leben in Dokumenten und Bildern. Arete Verlag, Hildesheim 2015, .
 Transcript of letter sent by Luz Long to Jesse Owens from Sicily while he was serving in the Wehrmacht. "Tell him about his father"

External links 
 Photo of Long and Owens
 

1913 births
1943 deaths
German male long jumpers
Athletes (track and field) at the 1936 Summer Olympics
German Army personnel killed in World War II
Olympic athletes of Germany
Olympic silver medalists for Germany
European Athletics Championships medalists
Athletes from Leipzig
Medalists at the 1936 Summer Olympics
Olympic silver medalists in athletics (track and field)
Leipzig University alumni
German Army soldiers of World War II